Takahiro Tasaki (田﨑敬浩; born 8 December 1984), better known by his stage name EXILE TAKAHIRO, is a Japanese singer and actor. He is the vocalist of Exile and Ace of Spades.

Takahiro grew up in Nagasaki Prefecture.

Biography
Takahiro Tasaki was born on 8 December 1984, and was raised up in Nagasaki Prefecture. He has a younger sister.

He became a big fan of Exile when he and his friends attended one of their concerts in 2005. He decided to join the "EXILE Vocal Battle Audition 2006 ~ASIAN DREAM~" and became the final winner of the audition, held at Nippon Budokan on 22 September 2006. After he won, he eventually became the new vocalist of Exile alongside original member Atsushi.

The addition of Takahiro to the group was considered Exile's second era. After he joined, he was given the stage name TAKAHIRO and the group went on to release 3 singles and an album to allow fans, new and old, to adapt to the "new" Exile. They held their tour EXILE LIVE TOUR 2007 EXILE EVOLUTION during May 2007 to further promote the new image of their group. The tour ended at Tokyo Dome on 5 August 2007.

In April 2012, he became the vocalist of the rock band Ace of Spades. They debuted on 22 August in the same year with the single "WILD TRIBE".

On 26 June 2013, he made a solo debut with the single "Issen Ichibyou" (一千一秒; One Thousand and One Second). Takahiro wrote 3 out of the 4 songs from the single himself.

In January 2014, he made his acting debut in the Nippon TV drama Senryoku-gai Sōsa-kan (戦力外捜査官; External Force Investigator). On 5 March 2014, he released his 2nd single "Love Story" which was also used as the theme song for his first drama. Additionally, Takahiro held his first solo exhibition Hajime - Enogu Baka Nisshi - (始－絵具バカ日誌－; Beginning Painter's Diary) at Saitama Super Arena TOIRO in June of the same year. It showcased approximately 200 of his artworks, including calligraphy, paintings and digital art which fuses calligraphy and photography.

On 20 February 2015, it was announced that Takahiro's first drama from 2014 would have a sequel titled Senryoku-gai Sōsa-kan Hime Deka Kurage Senba (戦力外捜査官　姫デカ・海月千波). On 23 September 2015, Takahiro released his first solo album the VISIONALUX. It was also announced that one of its tracks, "Itsuka mata Aetara", was chosen as the TV commercial theme song for the first season of American series Gotham. Takahiro's first solo album sold about 39.000 copies in the first week of its release and immediately took the 1st spot on Oricon's weekly albums ranking. Between the beginning of 2014 and the end of 2015, Takahiro starred in several commercials for Samantha Thavasa's Samantha Thavasa meets SAMANTHA KINGZ collection alongside supermodel Miranda Kerr.

On 28 March 2017, it was announced that Takahiro would make his stage acting debut in the Japanese premiere of the British play MOJO and that he had been selected for the main role. On 4 October, he released his 3rd single "Eternal Love". It was his first solo release in two years since his first album. On 6 December, he released his first mini-album All-The-Time Memories. Dream Ami participated in the music video as well as the chorus of the track "BLACK BEANZ" and "Irish Blue" was written for Takahiro by Glay's Takuro.

On 13 June 2018, Takahiro attended the Short Short Film Festival & Asia 2018 (SSFF & ASIA), the largest international short film festival, to present the short film Canaria (カナリア) in which he participated in as an actor.

On 30 January 2019, it was announced that he would play the lead role in the movie Boku ni, Aitakatta (僕に、会いたかった), which would be released on 10 May. This would be his first time starring in a movie. A few months later, on 15 April, it was announced that Takahiro would be starring in the historical movie Three Nobunaga (3人の信長) too. It was released on 20 September. On 8 July in the same year, he released the digital single "Last Night", his first musical work as a solo artists in nearly 2 years. The track is a self-cover of Ace of Spades' song with the same name. On 13 July, Takahiro performed at the live event J-WAVE LIVE 20th ANNIVERSARY EDITION at Yokohama Arena. On the 27th of the same month, he also started the fan club event tour TAKAHIRO Road Station 2019 (TAKAHIRO 道の駅 2019). During one of the stops it was announced that Takahiro would release another digital single, "YOU are ROCK STAR" on 16 October.

Personal life 
On 1 September 2017, it was announced that he had married Emi Takei. They had co-starred in Takahiro's acting-debut drama Senryoku-gai Sōsa-kan and its sequel together. Their first daughter was born in March 2018.

Discography

Singles

Digital Singles

Studio albums

Mini-albums

Other songs (prior to his solo debut)

Collaboration works

Participation works

Works

Lyrics

Compositions

Tie-ups

Exhibitions

Live

Filmography

TV dramas

Films

Short films

TV programs

Stage

Advertisements

Others

Bibliography

Magazine serializations

References

External links

 at Exile Official Website 
 EXILE TAKAHIRO - Official YouTube Channel

Japanese male pop singers
Japanese male actors
Musicians from Nagasaki Prefecture
1984 births
Living people
LDH (company) artists
21st-century Japanese singers
21st-century Japanese male singers